The 2015 European Women's U-17 Handball Championship is the 12th edition, which took place in North Macedonia. Sweden was the defending champion but Denmark won.

Qualified teams

Preliminary round

Group A

Group B

Group C

Group D

Main round

Group M1

Group M2

Knockout stage

Semifinals

Third place game

Final

Rankings and awardees

Final standings

{| width=95%
|- align=center
|2015 Women's Youth Handball European Champions
Denmark

|}

All Star TeamGoalkeeper: Left Wing: Left Back: Playmaker: Pivot: Right Back: Right Wing: 

Other awardsTop Scorer: Best Defence Player: Most Valuable Player''': 

<small>Source:

References 
  

2015 in handball
Youth
2015 in women's handball